Spirovskaya is a rural locality (a village) in Gorodetskoye Rural Settlement, Kichmengsko-Gorodetsky District, Vologda Oblast, Russia. The population was 21 as of 2002.

Geography 
Spirovskaya is located 40 km northwest of Kichmengsky Gorodok (the district's administrative centre) by road. Pavlovo is the nearest rural locality.

References 

Rural localities in Kichmengsko-Gorodetsky District